The Goguryeo revival movements were various attempts to revive the Kingdom of Goguryeo after its defeat by the Silla-Tang alliance in 668. After 668, several different revival movements were initiated throughout the former territories of Goguryeo and some even in Tang territory. A new theory among Korean historians states that Gung-ye, the founder of Taebong, was a descendant of Anseung and the Go Dynasty. This theory has not been completely accepted yet, as more research is still in process.

The revival movement of Anseung and Geom Mojam 
After the fall of Goguryeo in 668, the Goguryeo general Geom Mojam gathered Goguryeo refugees and revived Goguryeo at Hanseong, one of the three capitals of Goguryeo located in South Hwanghae. Geom selected Prince Anseung, a descendant of king Bojang, to become the new king of the revived Goguryeo.

This new Goguryeo was greatly assisted by Silla and its ruler, Munmu of Silla. The two factions arose from within the kingdom, and the infighting resulted in the assassination of Geom Mojam on King Anseung's orders. Geom Mojam's death left the restored Goguryeo gravely weakened. Anseung surrendered to King Munmu shortly after the event, and was given the title "King of Bodeok" as well as the Silla Royal surname "Kim".” The exact number of Goguryeo people that followed Anseung into Silla is unknown, but it is thought that most of them became a part of the Kingdom of Bodeok. The Kingdom of Bodeok was demolished in 683 by King Sinmun, son of King Munmu, mostly due to the possible threat of rebellion by the Goguryeo people.

The Revival movement of Dae Jung-Sang 
When Goguryeo fell in 668, General Dae Jung-sang and his son, General Dae Joyeong, led Goguryeo soldiers from the Western borders to Dongmo Mountain, and established the kingdom of Balhae.

See also 
Renovatio imperii Romanorum
Goguryeo
Geom Mojam
Anseung
Munmu of Silla

References

Goguryeo